Johnson Township is an inactive township in Scotland County, in the U.S. state of Missouri.

Johnson Township was erected in 1842.

References

Townships in Missouri
Townships in Scotland County, Missouri